Thiruvabharanam is a 1973 Indian Malayalam-language film, directed by J. Sasikumar and produced by E. K. Thyagarajan. The film stars Prem Nazir, Madhu, Vijayasree,  Jayabharathi and Kaviyoor Ponnamma. The film had musical score by R. K. Shekhar.

Cast
Prem Nazir
Madhu
Vijayasree
Jayabharathi
Kaviyoor Ponnamma
Thikkurissy Sukumaran Nair
Sreelatha Namboothiri
K. P. Ummer

Soundtrack
The music was composed by R. K. Shekhar and the lyrics were written by Sreekumaran Thampi.

References

External links
 

1973 films
1970s Malayalam-language films